Murciélago (Spanish for "Bat") was a Navarra fighting bull, who gained fame after Lamborghini chose to name a supercar after him, to continue the passion for bullfighting Ferruccio Lamborghini, the company's founder, was famous for. 

According to the PR-specialists, the bull survived 90 sword strokes in an October 5, 1879 fight against Rafael "El Lagartijo" Molina Sanchez, at the Coso de los califas bullring in Córdoba, Spain. Its name means bat in Spanish. It is said that Murciélago fought with such passion and spirit that the crowd called for his life to be spared, an honour which the torero bestowed. The bull, which came from the farm of Joaquin del Val de Navarra, was later presented as a gift to Don Antonio Miura. Together with his brother, Don Eduardo Miura, they brought Murciélago into the Miura line by siring him with 70 cows. Bulls from the Miura ranch, located near Seville, Spain, are known for being large and ferocious.

The story's validity has been criticised, with some saying that a bull who had been stabbed deeply two dozen times would never be able to survive and reproduce.

References

Bullfighting
Individual bulls in sport
Lamborghini